United States is an American comedy-drama series that aired on NBC from March 11 until April 29, 1980.

Larry Gelbart, the show's executive producer and chief writer, said the name United States was not a reference to the country but rather to "the state of being united in a relationship". Gelbart envisioned a series that would be "a situation comedy based on the real things that happen in my marriage and in the marriages of my friends".

Episodes tackled such topics as marital infidelity, household debt, friends who drink too much, death within the family, and sexual misunderstandings.

United States focused on Richard and Libby Chapin, an upwardly mobile couple who lived in a Los Angeles suburb, Woodland Hills. Beau Bridges played Richard, and Helen Shaver played Libby. Gelbart reverted to black-and-white script for the show's titles. He said that was to convey the mood of "a sophisticated '30s film." Gelbart also avoided use of background music and a laugh track. Scripts featured dialogue such as, "Just for once I'd like to be treated like a friend instead of a husband," and "Maybe you and Bob can go out and get yourselves one redhead with two straws."

United States premiered at 10:30 p.m. on March 11, 1980. NBC pulled it from the schedule within two months, after only nine of 13 episodes had aired. The series aired later that year in Britain on BBC2, under the title Married. The remaining episodes were not broadcast in the US until 1986, when the A&E cable channel aired United States.

The show's tagline made by NBC was "It will do to marriages what M*A*S*H did for war".

Cast
Beau Bridges - Richard Chapin
Helen Shaver - Libby Chapin
Rossie Harris - Dylan Chapin
Justin Dana - Nicky Chapin

Episodes

Reception
Writing in The Toronto Star, entertainment critic Ron Base (reviewing the first episode) felt the program lacked insight, and wrote that the program's emphasis on talk and arguments made Bridges and Shaver "surprisingly unlikable".

In their Complete Directory to Prime Time Network and Cable TV Shows (1946—Present), authors Tim Brooks and Earle Marsh characterize the show as "tedious, boring and didactic".

References

 Lurie, Alison. (1980, April 26-May 2). Are We Ready For Marriage—1980s-Style ... With No Sugar Added? TV Guide, pp. 4–8

External links

1980s American comedy-drama television series
1980 American television series debuts
1980 American television series endings
NBC original programming
Television shows set in Los Angeles